Kington may refer to:

Places

England 
 Kington, Herefordshire
 Kington, historical name of Kineton, Warwickshire
 Kington Hundred
 Kington, Worcestershire
 Kington Magna, Dorset
 Kington Langley, Wiltshire
 Kington St Michael, Wiltshire
 West Kington, Wiltshire

People 
 Kington (surname)

See also 
 Kingston (disambiguation)
 Kinston (disambiguation)